Golden is an unincorporated community in McCurtain County, Oklahoma, United States. Golden has a post office with ZIP code 74737, which opened on March 13, 1911. The community was named for its first postmaster, James M. Golden.

Demographics

References

Unincorporated communities in McCurtain County, Oklahoma
Unincorporated communities in Oklahoma